Alex Costa dos Santos or just Alex (born 29 January 1989 in Salvador, Bahia) is a Brazilian defender who plays for Rio Branco.

Career 
Alex Costa signed for ACF Fiorentina on 31 January 2007 at age of 18.

In June 2009, he left for Eupen.

References

External links

Alex Costa at Footballzz

1989 births
Living people
Brazilian footballers
Brazilian expatriate footballers
PFC Lokomotiv Plovdiv players
ACF Fiorentina players
K.A.S. Eupen players
R.F.C. Seraing (1922) players
Roma Esporte Apucarana players
Operário Ferroviário Esporte Clube players
FC Cascavel players
Rio Branco Football Club players
First Professional Football League (Bulgaria) players
Belgian Pro League players
Challenger Pro League players
Expatriate footballers in Bulgaria
Brazilian expatriate sportspeople in Bulgaria
Expatriate footballers in Italy
Brazilian expatriate sportspeople in Italy
Expatriate footballers in Belgium
Brazilian expatriate sportspeople in Belgium
Sportspeople from Salvador, Bahia
Association football defenders